The 1903–04 season was Burslem Port Vale's sixth consecutive season (tenth overall) of football in the English Football League. The club went the whole season without recording an away win, part of a club record 29 away games without victory. With the new rule of the direct free kick introduced, Arthur Rowley also wrote himself into the history books by becoming the first player to score from a free kick.

The first team was firmly established, and the players had been together for some years. The financial crisis that loomed over the club was held at bay by an FA Cup run and by selling a promising young winger.

Overview

Second Division
A rather quiet pre-season saw no major signings or departures, and hopes were built of an improvement on last season's ninth-place finish.

The first game of the season was on 7 September 1903 against Bolton Wanderers, where Arthur Rowley wrote himself into the history books by becoming the first player to score from a direct free kick. Five days later the Vale beat Manchester United 1–0, and their season got going – albeit very slowly. Four games later they found their second victory – against new boys Bradford City, however by October they had racked up just five points from their opening eight games. A seven-game unbeaten run saw them surge up the table towards the end of 1903. This run ended at Gainsborough Trinity, but could be justified by the fact that they had played three games in four days. They went on to muster just one point from seven games to find themselves back in the danger zone as players looked towards their promising cup run rather than the league itself. An inconsistent end to the season followed, though picking up points from eight of their last twelve games was enough to ensure safety. On the final game of the season 20,000 Woolwich Arsenal fans turned up to watch their team claim the championship, however the "Valeites" hung on for a draw, with Harry Cotton in remarkable form, and a goalless draw was enough to hand the league title to Preston North End. Port Vale were one of only two teams to take a point home from London that season. This was even more surprising considering that Vale went the whole season without recording an away win, and had to rely entirely on their home form to stay in the league. They finished two points ahead of the re-election zones, and were twenty points shy of promotion.

Adrian Capes was top scorer for the fourth consecutive season with seventeen goals, fourteen of them coming in the league. Tom Simpson contributed fifteen goals, and would only score thirteen more Football League goals in his entire career. Goalkeeper Harry Cotton missed just two games, as did right-back Ernest Mullineux; Harry Croxton, Arthur Rowley, Billy Heames, George Price, Bert Eardley, W. Perkins, and Joseph Holyhead made up the first of the first team – who each made a minimum of 35 out of 42 possible appearances in all competitions.

Finances
Again attendances were disappointing, and to improve the financial outlook players were sold as early as October, when a highly promising Tom Coxon signed to nearby Stoke for £200. Their FA Cup clash at Southampton saw them rake in a £491 share of gate receipts. A loss of £39 was recorded on the season, and raising wages and falling gate receipts were only off-set by the income from transfers and cup runs. Recognizing this, the directors insisted that a controversial policy of selling on players had to be adopted.

Cup competitions
In September the club were eliminated in both county cup competitions by Stoke by three goal margins. The "Valeites" found rather more success in the FA Cup, though had to win four matches to reach the First Round, at which point they were eliminated by Southampton of the Southern Football League. On the way they racked up a 6–0 home win over Stockport County in the Fourth Qualification Round Replay.

League table

Results

Burslem Port Vale's score comes first

Football League Second Division

Results by matchday

Matches

FA Cup

Birmingham Senior Cup

Staffordshire Senior Cup

Player statistics

Appearances

Scorers

Transfers

Transfers in

Transfers out

References
Specific

General

Port Vale F.C. seasons
Burslem Port Vale